SONY SAB (formerly SAB TV) is an Indian pay television channel owned by Culver Max Entertainment.

History
Sony SAB was launched as SAB TV by Gautam Adhikari and Markand Adhikari under their company Sri Adhikari Brothers (thus the acronym) on 23 April 1999. At first, it was launched as a Hindi-language comedy channel. Sony Pictures Networks took over SAB TV in March 2005 and rebranded it as Sony SAB, with a new focus on general entertainment and eventually turning itself into a youth channel. In 2008, Sony SAB changed its appeal to being a Hindi-language generalist network. However, it was only after September 2011, when the logo changed to 'Sony SAB' officially renewing the channel's name.

The high-definition feed of the channel was launched on 5 September 2016.

Yes Boss  is one of the longest-running show on the channel. After Yes Boss, Taarak Mehta Ka Ooltah Chashmah became the longest-running show.

Programming

Sony SAB's current programming includes Taarak Mehta Ka Ooltah Chashmah, Wagle Ki Duniya – Nayi Peedhi Naye Kissey, Pushpa Impossible, Ali Baba, Dil Diyaan Gallaan, Dhruv Tara – Samay Sadi Se Pare and Baalveer 3.

References

External links
 Official website
 Watch Sony SAB TV Live on Sony Liv

Television stations in Mumbai
Television channels and stations established in 2000
Hindi-language television stations
Sony Pictures Networks India
Hindi-language television channels in India
Sony Pictures Entertainment
Entertainment-related YouTube channels